The Nissan Diesel RN (kana:日産ディーゼル・RN) is a one-step light-duty bus produced by the Japanese manufacturer Nissan Diesel from 1996 until 2003. The range was primarily available as city bus.

Models 
KC-RN210CSN (1996) - FE6E engine (195ps)
KK-RN252CSN (1999) - FE6F engine (205ps)

Minibuses
RN
UD trucks
Vehicles introduced in 1996